King of the Wind is a 1990 British adventure film directed by Peter Duffell and starring Richard Harris, Glenda Jackson and Frank Finlay. It is based on the novel King of the Wind by Marguerite Henry. The film depicts the life of the Godolphin Arabian, an Arab colt in 18th-century Kingdom of Great Britain.

Cast

References

External links

1990 films
British adventure films
1980s adventure films
Films directed by Peter Duffell
Films about horses
Films set in the 18th century
Films set in England
Films produced by William N. Panzer
Films scored by John Scott (composer)
1990s English-language films
1980s English-language films
1980s British films
1990s British films